The second season of the American television series Star Trek: Strange New Worlds follows Captain Christopher Pike and the crew of the USS Enterprise in the 23rd century as they explore new worlds and carry out missions throughout the galaxy during the decade before Star Trek: The Original Series. The season is produced by CBS Studios in association with Secret Hideout, Weed Road Pictures, H M R X Productions, and Roddenberry Entertainment, with Akiva Goldsman and Henry Alonso Myers serving as showrunners.

Anson Mount, Ethan Peck, and Rebecca Romijn respectively star as Pike, Spock, and Number One, along with Jess Bush, Christina Chong, Celia Rose Gooding, Melissa Navia, and Babs Olusanmokun. A second season of Strange New Worlds was confirmed in January 2022, and filming took place at CBS Stages Canada in Mississauga, Ontario, from February to July 2022. The showrunners continued the first season's episodic storytelling approach, inspired by The Original Series, giving each episode a different genre and tone. Many of the regular actors and several guest stars portray younger versions of characters from The Original Series in the season, which also has a crossover with Star Trek: Lower Decks.

The season is expected to premiere on the streaming service Paramount+ in 2023, and run for 10 episodes.

Episodes

Frequent Star Trek director Jonathan Frakes also directed for the season, as did Valerie Weiss. Frakes's episode is a crossover with the animated series Star Trek: Lower Decks. The seventh through tenth episodes were respectively written by Kathryn Lyn & Bill Wolkoff, Davy Perez, Dana Horgan & Bill Wolkoff, and Henry Alonso Myers.

Cast and characters

Main 
 Anson Mount as Christopher Pike
 Ethan Peck as Spock
 Jess Bush as Christine Chapel
 Christina Chong as La'an Noonien-Singh
 Celia Rose Gooding as Nyota Uhura
 Melissa Navia as Erica Ortegas
 Babs Olusanmokun as Joseph M'Benga
 Rebecca Romijn as Una Chin-Riley / Number One

Recurring 
 Carol Kane as Pelia

Guests 
 Paul Wesley as James T. Kirk
 Dan Jeannotte as George Samuel "Sam" Kirk
 Tawny Newsome as Beckett Mariner
 Jack Quaid as Brad Boimler

Production

Development
After beginning development on Star Trek: Strange New Worlds, a spin-off from Star Trek: Discovery, executive producer Alex Kurtzman said he wanted it to be an ongoing series rather than a miniseries, and said it could explore the seven years between Discovery second season and the accident that seriously injures Christopher Pike in Star Trek: The Original Series. In November 2021, a second season of Strange New Worlds was reported to be starting production in February 2022. Frequent Star Trek director Jonathan Frakes confirmed the season order a month later, before Paramount+ officially announced it in January 2022.

Writing
Because they began work on the second season before the first was released, showrunners Henry Alonso Myers and Akiva Goldsman did not know how the series would be received but chose to commit to its structure of standalone episodes with season-long character arcs. Myers said the season would "go for broke" in differentiating its episodes with unique genres. Goldsman said it would have some genres and "creative stretches" that had not been seen in the Star Trek franchise before, explaining that he felt the series needed to take "big swings" despite potential fan criticisms and the second season would do this even more than the first.

Myers said the second season would follow-up on the "serialized threads" left by the first season, including the arrest of Number One, the death of Hemmer, and La'an Noonien-Singh taking a leave of absence from the USS Enterprise. Elaborating on Number One's arrest after she was revealed to be a genetically altered Illyrian in the first season, Myers said he and Goldsman did not know how they would resolve that story when they added it as a cliffhanger in the first-season finale, but the writers came up with a "straight-down-the-middle classic Trek episode" idea to address the issue in the second season that made Myers glad to have added the cliffhanger.

In December 2021, Kurtzman said there was potential for the different Star Trek series he was producing to crossover, as long as there was a story reason to justify this. The season was announced to have a crossover episode with the animated series Star Trek: Lower Decks in July 2022. Myers explained that series' writer David Reed also worked on the series The Boys, which stars Lower Decks voice actor Jack Quaid. Reed and Quaid had discussed the potential of their Star Trek series crossing over, and Reed suggested the idea to the Strange New Worlds writers. They moved forward with the idea after Kurtzman also suggested it independently. Lower Decks showrunner Mike McMahan, who did uncredited writing for the first-season episode "Spock Amok", was "heavily involved" in the crossover episode. He worked on the episode's dialogue to make it "feel more Lower Decks".

Casting
Anson Mount, Ethan Peck, and Rebecca Romijn star in the series as Captain Christopher Pike, science officer Spock, and first officer Una Chin-Riley / Number One, respectively. Also starring are Jess Bush as nurse Christine Chapel, Christina Chong as chief security officer La'an Noonien-Singh, Celia Rose Gooding as cadet Nyota Uhura, Melissa Navia as helmsman Erica Ortegas, and Babs Olusanmokun as Dr. Joseph M'Benga.

In March 2022, Paul Wesley was revealed to have been cast in the season as James T. Kirk, the Enterprise captain from The Original Series who was first played by William Shatner. Wesley's casting was announced before the premiere of the first season after he was spotted filming on location in Toronto. Myers cautioned fans about making assumptions regarding Kirk's involvement in the series, stating that the character was a guest who would not yet replace Pike as captain and who could be introduced in "a lot of different ways" due to Strange New Worlds being a science fiction series. He added that they did not want to "leave a story on the table" and decided to explore a young Kirk in this time period after already exploring characters such as Spock, Uhura, and Chapel who appear alongside Kirk in The Original Series. Wesley was cast after a conversation with Myers and Goldsman, who had already held "a bunch of auditions" for the role. They hired him to play a younger version of the character in the second season, but the actor made a surprise first appearance as Kirk during the first-season finale where he played an alternate version from a potential future that Pike visits. Wesley did not want to imitate Shatner, but he said his portrayal of a younger Kirk in the second season would be closer to Shatner's than the alternate version from the first season. The second season explores the relationship between James Kirk and his brother George Samuel "Sam" Kirk, played by returning guest star Dan Jeannotte.

With the announcement of the Lower Decks crossover in July 2022, Tawny Newsome and Jack Quaid were revealed to be reprising their roles as Beckett Mariner and Brad Boimler from that series. After the death of chief engineer Hemmer in the first season, Myers said the second season would introduce a new engineer who would not be Montgomery Scott (the future chief engineer of the Enterprise as portrayed by James Doohan in The Original Series). Though Scott had a brief role in the first-season finale as part of the potential future that Pike visits, Myers explained that they were not ready to bring the character into the series' main events or cast a new actor in the role which is why that finale cameo was offscreen with a voice actor providing the lines. In September 2022, Carol Kane was revealed to have a recurring role in the second season as the new engineer, Pelia.

Design
The virtual technology used to display digital backgrounds on an LED video wall during filming for the series required additional design work during pre-production. Visual effects company Pixomondo worked alongside the series' art department to design the environments that needed to be displayed, and a dedicated "virtual art department" was created for the second season. In addition to the sets that production designer Jonathan Lee and his team built for the first season, the second season also features sets for the Enterprise port galley, science lab, nacelle room, and shuttle bay. Lee described the port galley, which is the ship's lounge and bar, as "our new baby" and explained that they built it for the kinds of scenes that were filmed in the mess hall during season one. This was because the mess hall set, which used virtual production technology, was "difficult to schedule" and required space environments to be created for the video wall for each scene whereas the port galley has no windows.

Filming
Filming began on February 1, 2022, at CBS Stages Canada in Mississauga, Ontario, under the working title Lily and Isaac. Producing director Chris Fisher directed the first episode of the season. By March 14, Row had begun directing the third episode of the season, while Eduardo Sánchez directed the fourth. Jonathan Frakes travelled to Toronto during the week of April 4 to direct an episode for the season, after he was prevented from working on the first season by changes to his directing schedule on Star Trek: Picard caused by the pandemic. Frakes directed the Lower Decks crossover episode, working around scheduling conflicts for Quaid with The Boys and Newsome with the series Space Force. Filming for the sixth episode, which was directed by Dan Liu, began by the week of April 11. Work on the episode was still underway at the end of the month. Valerie Weiss also directed for the season. Production for the second season wrapped on July 1.

Animation 
McMahan was involved in the animated portions of the Lower Decks crossover episode, which used the same animation team and style as Lower Decks; independent animation studio Titmouse provides the animation for that series, using a style that reflects the look of "prime time animated comedy" series such as The Simpsons. McMahan also directed the voice actors for the episode.

Music 
Composer Nami Melumad began work on the season's score by late July 2022, and was recording it with a 55-piece orchestra (up from the 37-piece orchestra used for the first season). Melumad also introduced a choir for the season.

Marketing
The series was discussed during the Star Trek Universe panel at San Diego Comic-Con in July 2022, when the crossover with Star Trek: Lower Decks was announced. Kane's casting was announced at another panel for the series at a "Star Trek Day" event on September 8 where a clip from the season was released.

Release
The season is expected to premiere on the streaming service Paramount+ in the United States, Latin America, Australia, and the Nordics in 2023, and run for 10 episodes. It is released in Canada by Bell Media (broadcast on CTV Sci-Fi Channel before streaming on Crave), in New Zealand on TVNZ, and in India on Voot. It will be released in other countries and territories as Paramount+ becomes available there.

References

External links 
 
 

Strange New Worlds 02
Television series set in the future
Upcoming television seasons